Chisht Khujehlar (also Romanized as Chīsht Khūjehlar; also known as Chīsht Khūhehlar) is a village in Zavkuh Rural District, Pishkamar District, Kalaleh County, Golestan Province, Iran. At the 2006 census, its population was 181, in 39 families.

References 

Populated places in Kalaleh County